Silvey is a surname. Notable people with the surname include:

Anita Silvey (born 1947), American author, editor, and literary critic 
Ben Silvey (1894–1948), American assistant director, producer, and production manager
Craig Silvey (born 1982), Australian novelist
Ryan Silvey (born 1976), American politician
Samuel D. Silvey, British statistician
Shirley Silvey (1927–2010), American animator
Susie Silvey (born 1956), English actress, dancer and model